Rick Baker (born 1950) is an American special makeup effects artist.

Rick Baker may also refer to:

Rick Baker (mayor) (born 1956), former mayor of St. Petersburg, Florida
"The Righteous Maker" Rick Baker (born 1982), American professional wrestler also known as D-Ray 3000

See also
 Richard Baker (disambiguation)